Wizards of the Coast has created, produced and sponsored multiple web series featuring Dungeons & Dragons. These shows have typically aired on the official Dungeons & Dragons Twitch and YouTube channels. Some have been adapted into podcasts.

Actual play series 
A Dungeons & Dragons actual play series is a show where the cast plays the game and features a Dungeon Master (DM) who guides the narrative.

2010s

2020s

Events 
Wizards of the Coast has run Dungeons & Dragons themed events to announce new storylines and products which feature many streamed shows over the course of the event. Some official web series have been piloted at these events.

Other

References 

Actual play web series
Dungeons & Dragons actual play
Lists of internet series
Works based on Dungeons & Dragons